Swift is an English surname. Notable people with the surname include:

Adam Swift (born 1961), British political philosopher and sociologist

Allan Swift (1935–2018), American politician
Austin Swift (born 1992), American actor
Ben Swift (born 1987), British racing cyclist
Bill Swift (born 1961), American baseball player
Bill Swift (1930s pitcher) (1908–1969), American baseball player
Catherine Swift (living), Canadian businesswoman
Charles Swift (born 1961), American attorney
Clement Nye Swift (1846–1918), American painter
Clive Swift (1936–2019), British actor
Connor Swift (born 1995), British racing cyclist
D'Andre Swift (born 1999), American football player
David Swift (actor) (1931–2016), British actor
David Swift (director) (1919–2001), American screenwriter, animator, director, and producer
Deborah Swift (born 1955), English historical novelist
Edward D. Swift (1870–1935), U.S. astronomer
Ellen Swift (living), British archaeologist
Ember Swift (living), Canadian singer-songwriter
Emma Swift (born 1981), Australian singer-songwriter
Frank Swift (1913-1958), English footballer
Gareth Swift (died 2010), rugby league footballer of the 2000s
George R. Swift (1887–1972), U.S. politician
Graham Swift (born 1949), British novelist
Gustavus Franklin Swift (1839–1903), U.S. entrepreneur, founder of Swift & Company meatpacking plants
Harry Swift (medicine) (1858–1937), medical practitioner, researcher and academic in Adelaide, South Australia
Henry Adoniram Swift (1823–1896), U.S. politician
Innis P. Swift (1882–1953) American World War II general
Jane Swift (born 1965), American politician
Jeremy Swift (born 1960), British actor
Joe Swift (born 1965), English garden designer, journalist and television presenter
John Swift (disambiguation), several people
John Franklin Swift (1829–1891), American politician and author
Jonathan Swift (1667–1745), Irish author, satirist, political pamphleteer and cleric
Joseph Gardner Swift (1783–1865), American army officer
Justin Swift (born 1975), American football player
Kate Swift (1923–2011), American feminist writer and editor
Katherine Swift (1956–2004), Irish-born Portuguese artist and ceramicist
Kay Swift (1897–1993), American composer
Lewis Swift (1820–1913), U.S. astronomer
Mary Amelia Swift (1812–1875), American teacher and textbook writer
Mary Wood Swift (1841–1927), American suffragist and clubwoman
Morrison I. Swift (1856–1946), U.S. social theorist, organizer and activist
Parton Swift (1876–1952), New York politician and judge
Patrick Swift (1927–83), Irish painter
Philetus Swift (1763–1828), New York politician
R.B. Swift (living), American journalist
Rebecca Swift (1964–2017), British poet and essayist
Richard Swift (disambiguation), several people
Robert Swift (disambiguation), several people
Scott H. Swift (born 1957), retired United States Navy admiral
Stromile Swift (born 1979), basketball player
Susie Forrest Swift (Sister M. Imelda Teresa; 1862–1916), American editor, Salvation Army worker, Catholic nun
Taylor Swift (born 1989), American singer-songwriter
Tom Swift (disambiguation), several people
Todd Swift (born 1966), Canadian poet
William Swift (1848–1919), governor of Guam and United States Navy rear admiral

English-language surnames